Diplomoceratidae is a family of ammonites included in the order Ammonitida. Fossils of species within this genus have been found in the Cretaceous sediments (age range: from 99.7 to 66.043 million years ago). Studies of Diplomoceras suggest that members of this family could reach lifespans of over 200 years.

Genera
 Chesapeakella Kennedy and Cobban, 1993
 Diplomoceras Hyatt, 1900
 Glyptoxoceras Spath, 1925
 Neancyloceras Spath, 1926
 Scalarites Wright and Matsumoto, 1954
 Neoglyptoxoceras Collignon, 1969
 Phylloptychoceras Spath, 1953
 Oxybeloceras Hyatt, 1900
 Polyptychoceras Yabe, 1927
 Pseudoxybeloceras Wright and Matsumoto, 1954
 Solenoceras Conrad, 1860

References

External links
 
 

Ammonitida families
Turrilitoidea